Oleksandr Lavrentsov (born 15 December 1972 in Izmail) is a retired Ukrainian professional footballer.

Career
He played 4 games in the 2002 UEFA Intertoto Cup for FC Krylia Sovetov Samara.

He was called up to Ukraine national football team more than once, but never gained a cap.

Honours
 Ukrainian Premier League bronze: 1999, 2000.
 Most games without goals allowed in a season for FC Krylia Sovetov Samara: 13 (in 2001).

External links
 Profile at footballdatabase.eu
 Profile at Official FFU Site (Ukr)

1972 births
Living people
Ukrainian footballers
Russian Premier League players
NK Veres Rivne players
MFC Mykolaiv players
FC Kryvbas Kryvyi Rih players
PFC Krylia Sovetov Samara players
FC Moscow players
FC Arsenal Kyiv players
FC Dnister Ovidiopol players
Ukrainian expatriate footballers
Expatriate footballers in Russia
Ukrainian football managers
FC Oryol players
Association football goalkeepers
Ukrainian expatriate sportspeople in Russia